Xi gua lao is a traditional dish of Beijing cuisine. It is a thickened and chilled watermelon soup eaten in summer time.

Preparation
The dish is commonly prepared using these ingredients: watermelon, cherries, agar, sugar and vanilla powder. 

Water is mixed with agar, vanilla powder and sugar and boiled into a syrup. The watermelon is crushed to get the juice out of it and mixed with the syrup. The mixture is then chilled until thick and served cold.

See also
 List of Chinese desserts
 List of desserts
 List of melon dishes

References

Beijing cuisine
Chinese desserts
Fruit dishes
Watermelons
Melon dishes